The discography of the Cherry Poppin' Daddies, a Eugene, Oregon-based ska-swing band, consists of eight studio albums, two compilation albums, five singles and three demo EPs, among other releases.

The Cherry Poppin' Daddies were formed in 1989 by singer Steve Perry and bassist Dan Schmid following the disbandment of their garage rock group Saint Huck, releasing their debut album Ferociously Stoned in 1990 on independent label Sub Par Records. After finding cult success in the Pacific Northwest region, the Daddies established their own label, Space Age Bachelor Pad Records, self-producing and self-releasing 1994's Rapid City Muscle Car and 1996's Kids on the Street, the latter proving to be a minor commercial breakthrough on the heels of the mid-1990s third wave ska revival, earning distribution through Caroline Records.

In 1997, the Daddies signed with Universal Music Group subsidiary Mojo Records to release Zoot Suit Riot, a compilation of their swing material. Arriving at the onset of the late 1990s swing revival, Zoot Suit Riot became the band's most commercially successful release to date, selling over two million copies in the United States while its eponymous single became a radio hit. Following the commercial failure of their 2000 follow-up Soul Caddy, the Daddies were eventually dropped from Mojo and entered a hiatus, resurfacing in 2008 to independently record and release their fifth studio album, Susquehanna. In 2009, the band briefly joined indie label Rock Ridge Music to release the ska compilation Skaboy JFK and a re-release of Susquehanna. The Daddies independently released their sixth studio album, a swing/rockabilly double album entitled White Teeth, Black Thoughts, in 2013, followed by the Rat Pack tribute album Please Return the Evening in 2014 and the Cotton Club-era jazz tribute The Boop-A-Doo in 2016. The band's eleventh album, the ska punk-oriented Bigger Life, was released in the summer of 2019.

Studio albums

Compilation albums

Extended plays

Singles

Music videos

Videography
 "Brown Derby Jump" (live), performed in the documentary Punk Rock Summer Camp (1998)
 AMC Swings!, television special hosted by and featuring the music of the Cherry Poppin' Daddies (1999)
 "Zoot Suit Riot" (live), performed on the instructional VHS Swing: The Romance of Dance (1999)

Other appearances

Non-album tracks
The following are songs that did not receive a release on a studio or compilation album.

References

Discographies of American artists
Rock music group discographies